Stenocactus is a genus of cacti in the Cactaceae family.

Synonymy
The following genera have been brought into synonymy with Stenocactus:
Echinofossulocactus Britton & Rose
Efossus Orcutt (orth. var.)

Species

References

External links
Stenocactus at cactiguide.com
 

Cactoideae genera
Cactoideae
Taxa named by Alwin Berger
Taxa named by Karl Moritz Schumann